The Nicéphore Niépce Museum is a museum dedicated to the history of photography founded in 1972, officially designated a Musée de France, and dedicated to the inventor of photography Nicéphore Niépce (1765–1833). The Nicéphore Niépce Museum is located in Chalon-sur-Saône in Saône-et-Loire, France.

Collection and exhibitions
Located in the former Royal Messengers' lodgings, the Nicéphore Niépce Museum holds a collection of rare photographs and over 6,000 cameras and related items. Additionally, the museum presents exhibits that range from early cameras belonging to Nicéphore Niépce and his associate Daguerre, the first color photographs, photochromes from 1868 to holographic images; as well as, early Kodak and Globuloscope panoramic cameras. The exhibits at the museum inform the visitors of the invention of photography while also showcasing the immense progress made in the field of photography in last 200 years.

See also
 List of museums devoted to one photographer

References

External links
 The First Photography Books - online slideshow by the Nicéphore Niépce Museum

Museums in France
Photography museums and galleries in France
Photo archives in France
1972 establishments in France
Biographical museums in France